Allotinus albicans is a butterfly in the family Lycaenidae. It was described by Okubo in 2007. It is found in the Philippines (Mindanao).

References

Butterflies described in 2007
Allotinus